The Griswold was an automobile manufactured in Detroit, Michigan by the Griswold Motor Car Company in 1907.  The Griswold was offered with three different chassis, with two-cylinder water-cooled engines rated at 10 hp, 15 hp, 20 hp.  The track was an unusual  size.

References
 

Defunct motor vehicle manufacturers of the United States
Motor vehicle manufacturers based in Michigan
Defunct manufacturing companies based in Detroit